Elizabeth Barrow may refer to:

Elizabeth Dickens (née Barrow; 1789–1863) wife of John Dickens and mother of Charles Dickens
Eliza Mary Barrow, murdered by Frederick Seddon in 1911